This article presents a list of motor vehicle deaths in Japan by year. Deaths are currently defined by those who die within 30 days of the date of the accident, but 1980 and before are one day accident deaths.  Fatalities reached a record high in 1970. The Index base year is 1989. (Index=100)

Per population, fatalities are 1/4 in 2008 of that of 1970, and per kilometer are one sixth in 2007 of the 1970 rate.  The total for 2012 was 4,411 deaths. and 2017 has dropped to 3,694 deaths, of this 2,020 involved a driver over aged 65 or 54.7% of the total, with sharply rising rates of deadly accident with each decade of driver age after 65. Some 36% of deaths were pedestrians, 13% were bicyclists, alcohol related deaths were 1/3 at 213 less than a decade earlier, among a wealth of other statistics. Total deaths has fallen further to 3,215 in 2019, with drivers over age 75 a concern. Total deaths has fallen further to 2,839 in 2020, with drivers. Total deaths has fallen further to 2,636 in 2021, with drivers.

Notes: Death definition before and after 1980 are not exactly comparable (1-day vs 30-day) but have this additional margin of error.

See also
List of motor vehicle deaths in Australia by year
List of motor vehicle deaths in Iceland by year
List of motor vehicle deaths in Thailand by year
Motor vehicle fatality rate in U.S. by year

References

 Statistics of Road Accidents Japan, National Police Agency
 Statistics Bureau of Japan, Traffic Accident Data

Motor vehicle deaths in Japan by year
Japan